The Breda A.9 was a biplane trainer produced in Italy in 1928 for the Regia Aeronautica. Conventional in design, it featured a single-bay, unstaggered wing cellule and fixed tailskid undercarriage. The student and instructor sat in tandem, open cockpits. A slightly smaller version, designated A.9-bis was developed for use in Italy's aeroclubs.

Operators

 Regia Aeronautica

Variants
A.9  Two-seat advanced training biplane.
A.9bis A slightly smaller  span version for aeroclubs.
A.10  Single-seat,  span, fighter-trainer prototype, powered by a  Isotta Fraschini V.6; one aircraft built.

Specifications (A.9)

See also

References

Further reading

External links

 Уголок неба

A.9
1920s Italian military trainer aircraft
Biplanes
Single-engined tractor aircraft
Aircraft first flown in 1928